The Pittsburg State Gorillas football team represents Pittsburg State University in collegiate level football. The Pittsburg State football team was formed in 1908, competes in NCAA Division II and is affiliated with the Mid-America Intercollegiate Athletics Association (MIAA). The Gorillas play their home games at Carnie Smith Stadium, more commonly referred to as "The Jungle", in Pittsburg, Kansas. Pittsburg State has won more games than any other program in NCAA Division II history. It has won four national championships (1957, 1961, 1991 and 2011) and 27 conference championships, including 13 conference titles in 20 seasons under former head coach Chuck Broyles.

History

Early years
The Pittsburg State football program began in 1908 under head coach Albert McLeland. McLeland compiled a record of 2–2–2 in his only season as head coach. John Fuhrer succeeded McLeland and served as Pitt State's football coach from 1909 to 1914 and 1918, compiling a record of 26–22–2.

The program enjoyed several years of success in the 1920s under head coach Garfield Weede. Weede coached the team to a 50–31–6 record from 1919 to 1928 including the school's first undefeated season in 1924. That year, his team was declared Kansas Collegiate Athletic Conference champions. Weede ended his tenure at Pittsburg on a downturn, losing every game of his final season of 1928. His squad only scored in two of seven games and allowed a total of 113 points.

During the 1930s and 1940s, Pittsburg State compiled mediocre records under head coaches Blue Howell (35–30–6) and Charles Morgan (44–43–15).

Carnie Smith era (1949–1966)
Pittsburg State experienced a turn-around from 1949 to 1966 under head coach Carnie Smith. During Smith's 18-year tenure as head coach, the team compiled a record of 116–52–6 and won two NAIA national championships in 1957 and 1961. The team completed perfect seasons at 11–0 in 1957 and 1961 with victories over Hillsdale College in the Holiday Bowl and Linfield College in the Camellia Bowl. The football stadium was later named after Smith.

Lester era (1967–1975)
Tom Lester took over as the Gorillas' head coach in 1967, the year Pittsburg State joined the Rocky Mountain Athletic Conference (RMAC). In nine years (1967–1975), Lester's teams compiled a record of 48–38–5 and won only one conference championship, the 1970 RMAC championship. In 1972, Pittsburg State joined the Great Plains Athletic Conference (GPAC), then the Central States Intercollegiate Conference in 1976.

Randleman era (1976–1981) 
From 1976 to 1981, Ron Randleman was Pittsburg State's head football coach. Randelman was credited with turning the football program around, compiling a 36–25–2 record in six seasons. He directed the Gorillas to three Central States Conference championships and a trip to the NAIA national finals in 1981. He received coach of the year honors from his conference and his NAIA district three times. In 1981, he was named NAIA National Coach of the Year and NAIA District Six Coach of the Year. On February 5, 1982, Randleman left Pittsburg State to take over at Sam Houston State.

Franchione era (1985–1989)
Dennis Franchione, a Pittsburg State alumnus, served as head football coach for five years from 1985 to 1989. During his five seasons with the Gorillas, he led the team to a 53–6–0 record, 37–1–0 in conference, won five conference titles, and was named NAIA National Coach of the Year twice. He tied the school record for victories in a single season three times before breaking it with the 12 victories of his 1989 team. During the 1989 season, the Gorillas moved from the NAIA to the NCAA's Division II and joined the MIAA.

Broyles era (1990–2009)
In 1990, Chuck Broyles became the head football coach at Pittsburg State. In his first season, the Gorillas went 10–0 in the regular season and won two games in the Division playoffs. In 1991, the team finished 13–1–1 and won the NCAA Division II Football Championship. His teams also played in the Division II championship games in 1992, 1995 and 2004. In 2004, the Gorillas finished 14–1, losing 36–31 to Valdosta State University in the Division II championship game. During his 20 years as Pittsburg State's head coach, Broyles compiled a record of 194–45–2. He retired at the end of the 2009 season. A prominent player during this time was two-time All-American punter Brian Moorman, who played at PSU from 1995 to 1998 and went on to become a Pro Bowl punter for the Buffalo Bills.

Beck era (2010–2019)
Tim Beck took over as Pittsburg State's head football coach in 2010. In his second year as head coach, the Gorillas compiled a record of 13–1 and returned to the NCAA Division II Championship game for the first time since 2004. The Gorillas defeated Wayne State 35–21 to win the title. He resigned after the 2019 season. John Brown, a wide receiver during this time, became a stud receiver for the Arizona Cardinals, Baltimore Ravens, and the Buffalo Bills.

Wright era (2020– ) 
On December 7, 2019, Brian Wright was named the 15th head coach of Pittsburg State.

Championships

National championship seasons

Conference championship seasons 
 Conference Championships (31)

All-time record vs. current MIAA teams
Official record (including any NCAA imposed vacates and forfeits) against all current MIAA opponents as of the end of the 2015 season:

Carnie Smith Stadium

With the success of the football program in the 1990s, Pittsburg State undertook a $5.8 million renovation of Carnie Smith Stadium in 2000, a further $2.5 million renovation to the west end in 2006 (including the addition of eight luxury boxes), and the addition of a $1.7 million Jumbotron in 2008 (the biggest in Division II at the time).

Northwest Missouri rivalry

Pittsburg State's chief rivalry game is with MIAA rival Northwest Missouri State University. The games between the two schools, formerly known as the Fall Classic at Arrowhead, was played at Arrowhead Stadium in Kansas City, Missouri from 2002 to 2013. The Gorillas went just 3–9 during the series, but four times the winner of the Classic went on to win the NCAA championship. After the 2013 game, Pittsburg State officials decided to move the game back to campus as a nod to the community with the city of Pittsburg contributing $5 million toward a $13 million indoor events center to be completed on the University's campus by spring 2015. The 2002 game had an attendance of 26,695 — the most of any Division II game.

See also
List of NCAA football teams by wins

References

External links
 

 
American football teams established in 1908
1908 establishments in Kansas